Ian Stuart Edward Carmichael,  (29 March 1930 –26 August 2011) was a British -born American igneous petrologist and volcanologist who established extensive quantitative methods for research in the thermodynamics of magmas.

Education
Carmichael was educated at Westminster School in London. He obtained a B.A. and M.A. in geology from the University of Cambridge in 1954, and his Ph.D. in 1958 from Imperial College London, where he wrote his thesis on Iceland's Thingmuli volcano.

Career and research
In 1964 Carmichael moved to the United States and became a member of the faculty at University of California, Berkeley, where he remained throughout his life.

Awards and honours
Carmichael was the recipient of numerous awards and recognitions including a Gedenkschrift, An issue honoring Ian S. E. Carmichael, in the September, 2013, issue of Contributions to Mineralogy and Petrology, a Guggenheim Fellowship in 1992, the Arthur L. Day Medal from the Geological Society of America, the Bowen Award from the American Geophysical Union, and the Mineralogical Society of Great Britain and Ireland's 1992 Schlumberger Award. The mineral carmichaelite (IMA1996-062) was named in his honor.

Carmichael was elected a Fellow of the Royal Society in 1999. He was also a fellow of the Geological Society of America, the Mineralogical Society of America, and the American Geophysical Union.

References

American geochemists
American mineralogists
British geochemists
British volcanologists
1930 births
2011 deaths
Fellows of the Geological Society of America
Fellows of the American Geophysical Union
British geologists
British emigrants to the United States
British mineralogists
University of California, Berkeley faculty
Alumni of Imperial College London
Alumni of the University of Cambridge
People educated at Westminster School, London
Scientists from London
20th-century British scientists
20th-century American geologists
21st-century American geologists
21st-century American scientists